Park West is a large business park within west Dublin, Ireland, notable for its public art and with some residential development.  Over 300 companies, with over 10,000 employees, are based there.

Location and content
Located just inside the M50 orbital motorway in west Dublin, the development comprises several million square metres of office and retail space, along with a hotel, a private hospital, and three apartment complexes.

Park West is in the administration of Dublin City Council, and Dublin postal districts Dublin 10 and Dublin 12, chiefly the latter.

Art
Park West is home to Europe's tallest wind and water mobile sculpture, Wave by Angela Conner. It is a 39.3 metre (129 feet) tall sculpture made of polystyrene covered with layers of carbon resin. It is fixed into a 7.6 metre (25 foot) pit filed with 9.5 tonnes of lead.

Transport
The campus is accessible by road (primarily the (New) Nangor Road, as well as Killeen Road and Cloverhill), bus (routes G1 and 151) and rail at the Park West and Cherry Orchard railway station. Expressbus route 860 also serves the park at peak times and is mainly a shuttle service for workers in the industrial section of the park. At a moderate distance to the south is the Kylemore stop on the Luas red line.

Environment
The Grand Canal passes through the business park, with filter beds for the drawing off of water.

See also
Rising Universe - another Angela Conner sculpture.

References

External links
Park West Business Park
Sculptures at Park West (video)
Angela Conner website
Giant moving sculpture unveiled

Buildings and structures in South Dublin (county)
Business in the Republic of Ireland